Slumber Party Massacre is a 2021 slasher film directed by Danishka Esterhazy and written by Suzanne Keilly. It is described as a "modern reimagining" of and stand-alone sequel to the original 1982 film The Slumber Party Massacre, and the tenth film released in the overall Massacre franchise. It stars Hannah Gonera, Alex McGregor, Schelaine Bennett, Mila Rayne, and Rob van Vuuren and follows a girls' slumber party which becomes a bloodbath when an escaped mental patient arrives with a power drill.

Shout! Studios announced a remake of the film to be helmed by director Danishka Esterhazy and written by Suzanne Keilly. Production began in Stellenbosch, South Africa in March 2021, with the cast being announced in April.

Slumber Party Massacre made its world premiere at the Fantastic Fest in Austin, Texas on September 27, 2021, and was released on Syfy Channel on October 16. The film received generally positive reviews from critics, with praise for its feminist themes, gore and the performances of the cast, but criticism for its screenplay, character development and pacing.

Plot
In 1993, Trish Devereaux is having a slumber party in a cabin in Holly Springs, California with friends Jackie, Kim, and Diane. When Chad, Trish's ex-boyfriend, arrives to confront Trish, he looks through the window to see the girls dancing, and he begins to masturbate. He sees a strange figure on the other side of the cabin. The figure is Russ Thorn, a killer who uses his power drill and kills Chad. When Russ makes his way inside the cabin, Kim and Diane are murdered. When Trish tries to stop Jackie from opening the front door, Russ drills Jackie in the throat, killing her. Despite getting drilled through her hand, Trish successfully escapes from Russ by hitting him with an oar, sending him inside the lake. It is believed that Russ drowned but his body is never found.

In present-day Los Angeles, Trish's daughter Dana is heading out for a girls weekend with best friends Maeve, Breanie, and Ashley. En route, the girls are in for a scare when they learn that Maeve's younger sister Alix had stowed away. The girls reluctantly let Alix join them and as they are on their way to the house they rented. Their car breaks down in the renamed Jolly Springs. When Ashley sees an ad for a cabin for rent that night, the girls talk to Kay, the owner of the general store and the cabin. Kay reluctantly lets the girls rent the cabin and warns them to stay quiet and stay still. As the girls start dancing, Alix gets bored and goes out for a walk. She sees a few guys at the cabin across the lake and soon finds the mechanic's truck in the middle of the road. The mechanic Dave falls on Alix with drilled out eyes. A blood-soaked Alix goes back to the cabin and warns the others when they see her. The girls soon yell "pillow fight" and reveal to sport weapons such as knives and baseball bats. The girls reveal to Alix that they know Russ Thorn is still alive and they have set everything up in an attempt to bait him out and kill him once and for all after 20 more victims have fallen since Trish's encounter.

The girls are interrupted by two of the guys from the cabin across the lake, John and Matt. John reveals he is a huge fan of a crime podcast and he and his buddies have rented out the actual cabin Russ Thorn killed Trish's friends in. Noticing the weapons, Matt freaks out and he and John leave. Dana and Maeve realize that Russ could pop out and go after the guys so they decide to follow them. The guys return to the cabin and have some fun with Sean, Guy 1, and Guy 2. When Guy 1 decides to go for a quick walk outside the cabin, he sees Russ Thorn and is excited to see him. That is until Russ breaks out the drill and kills Guy 1. When the girls arrive to the guys' cabin, Russ turns off the lights and during the chaos, Russ kills Guy 2 by drilling him in the head. Russ escapes and the girls soon reveal to the surviving guys that Russ is alive and they need to stop them. Sean grabs his guitar while Matt and John grab legs off their chairs and go after Russ despite the girls' warning. As Dana encounters Russ, a chase leads to Sean attempting to stop Russ and ends up getting drilled in the face. When Russ follows Dana to her cabin, he attempts a sneak attack but soon is met by the girls, who after beating him up, gives Dana the chance to kill Russ with a slash to the throat. Alix runs out and repeatedly stabs Russ, ensuring his death.

The next morning, the girls are relieved that they don't have to act fake anymore. Meanwhile, Matt and John ponder everything going on. Matt decides to take a shower and he is killed by a mysterious assailant. When Alix is forced to watch Russ while they attempt to call the police, she begins to get violently ill from a tin of cookies gifted the night before. Ashley, who is a mechanic, attempts to fix Maeve's SUV, but finds the hood closed in on her by the same mysterious assailant, who kills Ashley after turning on the motor, which causes the car's fan blades to make impact. When the others discover both Russ' body has disappeared and sees Ashley under the hood, they are attacked by the assailant, who uses a nail gun. Breanie heads to the window to see if it is safe, and she is killed by a nail to her eye. Alix is still violently ill and Dana looks for help while Maeve takes care of her sister.

As Dana looks for help, she is confronted by John, who thinks she is responsible for Matt and Guy 1's death. Dana tells John she killed Russ but did not kill her friends. As Dana pleads with John that they should leave together to get help, John ends up ditching Dana. Dana finds Kay and tells her what has happened. Kay is revealed to be the mysterious assailant who killed Matt, Ashley, and Breanie because she is seeking revenge as she is none other than Russ Thorn's mother. Kay goes after Dana, Maeve, and Alix but soon enough, Trish arrives and starts a fight with Kay. When Kay uses a blade against Trish's injured hand, she is shocked to learn that Russ' drilling has caused the nerves in her hand to be completely damaged to where she can't feel pain. Dana helps Trish by giving her Russ' broken drill bit and Trish kills Kay by stabbing her in the chest with the broken drill bit. As Kay dies, Trish, Dana, Maeve, and Alix all hug as the terror finally ends.

Cast

Production
Shout! Factory obtained the rights to 270 of Roger Corman's Concorde-New Horizons library titles and opted to remake The Slumber Party Massacre, hiring Danishka Esterhazy to direct the film with Suzanne Keilly hired to write the script. The cast was announced in April 2021 with Hannah Gonera, Frances Sholto-Douglas, Alex McGregor, Mila Rayne, and Reze-Tiana Wessels as the would-be victims.

Production began in Stellenbosch, South Africa in March and only took eighteen days to shoot. Director Danishka Esterhazy and writer Suzanne Keilly intended to make the remake true to the original intention of Rita Mae Brown's 1982 script, but "flip the script" on classic horror movie tropes. A fan of the original franchise, Esterhazy used establishing shots from the 1982 original film as well as give "easter eggs" in the form of the "goose lamp" from the original and Sean's guitar is that of the one used by the Driller Killer in Slumber Party Massacre II without the auger at the end of it.

Originally, co-star Rob van Vuuren auditioned for the mechanic Dave before being asked to read for the role of the "Driller Killer" Russ Thorn. As van Vuuren comes from a physical theater background, he prepared for the role by watching clips of Michael Villella in the original 1982 film as well as watch an interview with Villella about how he played Thorn. While he was praised for his take on Russ Thorn, van Vuuren admits all he did was to emulate Villella. Having seen the film on November 10 during its South African premiere, van Vuuren said he enjoyed the film and said he wants to do more horror films as a result of his experience with this film.

On July 5, at the Cannes Film Festival, Raven Banner unveiled the sales art, which reveals comedian Rob Van Vuuren as the killer Russ Thorn alongside Gonera, Sholto-Douglas, McGregor, Rayne, and Wessels.

Release
The film made its world premiere at the Fantastic Fest in Austin, Texas on September 27, 2021. The film debuted on the Syfy Channel on October 16.

Reception
 Trace Thurman of Bloody Disgusting calls the film "a welcome addition to this new wave of modern slashers". Leslie Felperin of The Guardian Weekly praises Esterhazy saying "Esterhazy and co have a few clever-ish tricks up their sleeves that invert viewer expectations". Aedan Juvet of Screen Rant said that the film was one of the most rewatchable horror films of 2021, writing "much like its predecessor, it has the potential to become a total cult classic".

References

External links
 

2021 films
2021 horror films
2021 independent films
2020s English-language films
2020s feminist films
2020s serial killer films
2020s slasher films
2020s teen horror films
American feminist films
American independent films
American serial killer films
American slasher films
American teen horror films
English-language South African films
Films about stalking
Films shot in the Western Cape
Horror film remakes
Massacre (franchise)
Remakes of American films
South African horror films
2020s American films